Studio Keel, also credited as Keel, is a Serbian clothing company specializing in swimwear for water polo, swimming and recreation for men and woman.

History 
Keel is established by Serbian water polo player Andrija Prlainović in 2014.

Water polo sponsorships
Teams using Keel equipment are;

National teams
 Serbia men's and women's team

Club teams
 Crvena zvezda
 Partizan
 Radnički Kragujevac
 Olympiacos
 Brisbane Barracudas
 California Republic
 Sea Wolf

See also
 List of swimwear brands

References

External links
  
 Keel website 

Sportswear brands
Clothing companies of Serbia
Clothing brands of Serbia
Serbian brands